"Don't Stop" is the fourth single by Baby Bash from his album Cyclone. It features Keith Sweat and is produced by DJ Felli Fel.

Chart positions

References

2008 singles
Baby Bash songs
Keith Sweat songs
Songs written by Keith Sweat
2008 songs
Arista Records singles
Songs written by Baby Bash